This is a listing of the horses that finished in either first, second, or third place and the number of starters in the Frank J. De Francis Memorial Dash Stakes, one of two Grade 1 sprints (other than Breeders Cup races) held in the United States. The "De Francis Dash" is run at a distance of six furlongs on dirt at Laurel Park Racecourse in Laurel, Maryland.

See also 

 Frank J. De Francis Memorial Dash Stakes
 Laurel Park Racecourse
 American Champion Sprint Horse
 Breeders' Cup Sprint

References

External links
Laurel Park racetrack

Horse races in the United States
Open sprint category horse races
Recurring events established in 1990
Laurel Park Racecourse
Horse races in Maryland